Murphy is a census-designated place (CDP) in Jefferson County, Missouri, United States. The population was 8,690 at the 2010 census, down from 9,048 in 2000.

History
A post office called Murphy was established in 1894, and remained in operation until 1906. The community has the name of the local Murphy family.

Geography
Murphy is located in northern Jefferson County at  (38.492954, -90.486544), with its northern border following the St. Louis County line. Missouri Route 30 passes through the community, leading northeast  to downtown St. Louis and southwest  to St. Clair.

Demographics

As of the census of 2000, there were 9,048 people, 3,463 households, and 2,489 families residing in the CDP. The racial makeup of the CDP was 97.75% White, 0.22% African American, 0.20% Native American, 0.43% Asian, 0.33% from other races, and 1.07% from two or more races. Hispanic or Latino of any race were 1.07% of the population.

There were 3,463 households, out of which 35.4% had children under the age of 18 living with them, 55.1% were married couples living together, 11.9% had a female householder with no husband present, and 28.1% were non-families. 22.1% of all households were made up of individuals, and 7.0% had someone living alone who was 65 years of age or older. The average household size was 2.61 and the average family size was 3.05.

In the CDP, the population was spread out, with 26.5% under the age of 18, 8.8% from 18 to 24, 32.6% from 25 to 44, 22.3% from 45 to 64, and 9.7% who were 65 years of age or older. The median age was 35 years. For every 100 females, there were 96.1 males. For every 100 females age 18 and over, there were 93.6 males.

The median income for a household in the CDP was $42,430, and the median income for a family was $48,060. Males had a median income of $35,373 versus $25,630 for females. The per capita income for the CDP was $20,374. About 4.5% of families and 5.8% of the population were below the poverty line, including 8.2% of those under age 18 and 6.0% of those age 65 or over.

References

Census-designated places in Jefferson County, Missouri
Census-designated places in Missouri